Tooty's Wedding is a 2010  short comedy film, written by Perrier Award Winners Ben Willbond and Laura Solon and directed by Frederic Casella. It was screened as part of the 2012 Sundance Film Festival, having been selected from a record 7,675 submissions.

A feature-length version of the short film, in which "a young couple's marriage hilariously hits the rocks during a weekend wedding in the country" won awards at the Rhode Island International Film Festival (RIIFF), LA ShortsFest 2011, Aesthetica Short Film Festival and New York Friar’s Club is now in development.

Reception 
Winner – Grand Prize for Best Comedy at the Rhode Island International Film Festival 
Winner – Jury prize for Best Short at the Friars Club Film Festival 
Winner – Best Comedy at Aesthetica Short Film Festival 2011  
Winner – Award of Merit – Accolade Competition 2011 
Official selection for the Los Angeles International Short Film Festival

References

External links 

British short films
2010s English-language films